Tommy Price (born 1907, date of death unknown) was a speedway rider who rode for several teams between 1929 and 1937.

Career
Price first rode for Liverpool in 1929, and rode for both Liverpool and Preston in the 1929 and 1930 seasons. He rode for the Leicester Super team in the Northern League in 1931, scoring maximum points on his debut, but his season was cut short by a fractured elbow. He then took a break from the sport, returning for one season in 1934 with Birmingham Bulldogs, and then in 1936 he rode for both Liverpool (in the Provincial League) and Belle Vue (in the National League). 

He rode in a Provincial League representative team in two matches against Australia in 1937.

Price's brothers Ernie and Norman were also professional speedway riders.

Players cigarette cards
Price is listed as number 37 of 50 in the 1930s Player's cigarette card collection.

References

1907 births
British speedway riders
English motorcycle racers
Leicester Super riders
Year of death missing